Clubiona subtilis is a spider species with Palearctic distribution. It is considered new to the fauna of Latvia since 2009.

See also 
 List of Clubionidae species

References

External links 

Clubionidae
Spiders of Europe
Palearctic spiders
Spiders described in 1867